Cocos (Keeling) Islands Airport  is an airport serving the Cocos (Keeling) Islands, a territory of Australia located in the Indian Ocean. The airport is on West Island, one of the South Keeling Islands and capital of the territory.

History

The airfield was built during World War II to support Allied aircraft in the war against Japan. Two airstrips were built, and three bomber squadrons were moved to the islands to conduct raids against Japanese targets in Southeast Asia and to provide support during the planned re-invasion of Malaya and reconquest of Singapore. The first aircraft to arrive were  Supermarine Spitfire Mk VIIIs of No. 136 Squadron RAF. They included some B-24 Liberator bombers from No. 321 (Netherlands) Squadron RAF (members of exiled Dutch forces serving with the Royal Air Force), which were also stationed on the islands.

Facilities

Airlines and destinations

Statistics
Cocos Island Airport served 14,896 revenue passengers during financial year 2017–2018.

See also
 List of airports in territories of Australia
 Aviation transport in Australia

References

Footnotes

Notes

Further reading

External links

 Cocos Islands Airport: a pictorial history archived version – compiled by Geoff Goodall
 Photos of the Cocos (Keeling) Islands Airport

Airports in territories of Australia
Airports in the Cocos (Keeling) Islands